Kenneth Houston (born 20 July 1941) is an Irish former rugby union player. He won 6 caps playing on the wing for the Irish rugby union side between 1960 and 1965. He was later a schoolteacher at Merchiston Castle School in Edinburgh until retiring in 2001.

External links
Kenneth Houston on Irish Rugby

1941 births
Living people
London Irish players
Ireland international rugby union players
Irish rugby union players
People associated with Edinburgh
Oxford University RFC players
Scottish schoolteachers
Rugby union wings